Novomekhelta is a rural locality (a selo) and the administrative centre of Novomekheltinsky Selsoviet, Novolaksky District, Republic of Dagestan, Russia. The population was 2,608 as of 2010. There are 50 streets.

Geography 
Novomekhelta is located 16 km northeast of Novolakskoye (the district's administrative centre) by road, on the right bank of the Yamansu River.

Nationalities 
Chechens, Avars and Laks live there.

References 

Rural localities in Novolaksky District